Marek Strandberg (born 25 September 1965 in Tallinn) is an Estonian materials scientist, businessman, caricaturist and politician. He has been member of XI Riigikogu.

He is a member of Estonian Greens.

References

1965 births
Living people
Estonian Greens politicians
Members of the Riigikogu, 2007–2011
Estonian scientists
Materials scientists and engineers
21st-century Estonian scientists
Estonian businesspeople
Estonian caricaturists
People from Tallinn
Politicians from Tallinn